The Scottish Women's Premier League Cup or SWPL Cup is a league cup competition in women's football in Scotland. The Cup is open only to the teams in the Scottish Women's Premier League. There are four rounds, including the final.

The competition was launched in 2002–03 along with the Scottish Women's Premier League, and the Cup's first winners were Kilmarnock. The trophy has been won most often by Hibernian, seven times.

The SWPL Cup changed to run on a summer schedule played in a single calendar year (from around March to November) from the 2009 edition until the 2019 competition and the 2020 edition, when the COVID-19 pandemic ended the season prematurely and caused the SWPL to revert to a winter format in all competitions.

Format
Up to 2015, eight of the twelve Premier League teams were drawn to play in the first round. The four winners and the other four teams then played in the quarter-finals. All matches were played over one leg.

Since the addition of the division SWPL 2 in 2016, all teams from the Premier League's two divisions have taken part in the cup. The last edition with the straight-knockout format was the 2019 Scottish Women's Premier League Cup

In a large change to the format for the 2020 edition of the Cup, a 16-team group stage was inaugurated, planned to qualify teams for the eight-team knockout phase, with the League's top two clubs given a bye to the quarter-finals; but the SWPL was abandoned early in the 2020 season, due to the COVID-19 outbreak, and the League reverted to the winter format as a result. The league cup was not played in the 2020–21 season. The group phase was played with all clubs in the 2021–22 SWPL Cup, which was completed and won by Celtic.

Past winners
Previous finals are:

See also
Scottish Women's Cup
Scottish Women's Football League First Division Cup
Scottish Women's Football League Second Division Cup

References

External links
Cup at Scottish FA
Scotland (Women) - List of Cup Winners at RSSSF

 
2
2002 establishments in Scotland
Recurring sporting events established in 2002